România Muncitoare ("Working Romania" or "Laborer Romania") was a socialist newspaper, published in Bucharest, Romania.

Political history of Romania
Newspapers published in Bucharest
Socialist newspapers
Publications with year of establishment missing